Ridgewood Preparatory School was a university-preparatory school located in Metairie, an unincorporated community in Jefferson Parish, Louisiana. It included grades PreK-12.

Ridgewood was approved by the State Department of Education and accredited by the Southern Association of Colleges and Schools.

Ridgewood's diverse student body came from six parishes as well as from countries around the world. In 2007, fifteen percent of students were foreign citizens coming from nations as far-ranging as Argentina, Nigeria, Norway, Japan, Vietnam and Egypt. The school was organized as a primary, middle, and high school. The academic year consisted of two semesters, each divided into three six-week grading periods. The school was operated as a non-profit corporation aided by an advisory board.

The school closed in January, 2023 due to “persistent low enrollment” and financial issues.

History
Ridgewood Preparatory School was founded in 1948 by Ottis O. Stuckey as a college preparatory school for boys in grades kindergarten through twelve. The original address was 201 Northline in Old Metairie. The school became co-educational in 1952.

The campus was moved in 1972 to the present address at 201 Pasadena Avenue in Metairie, Louisiana.  M.J. Montgomery Jr. is the current headmaster.

Hurricane Katrina
Ridgewood is part of the Greater New Orleans Metro area, and thus felt some effects of Hurricane Katrina, but the school did not flood. It was one of the first schools in the New Orleans Metro Area to re-open following the storm, opening on September 26, 2005.

Athletics
Ridgewood competed as a member of the Louisiana High School Athletic Association (LHSAA).  

Students competed in football, baseball, softball, basketball, track, tennis, volleyball, and soccer.  The Ridgewood extracurricular sports program began in middle school, with a soccer program available for children in grades 5-8. Junior varsity participation in volleyball, basketball, softball, and baseball usually beginning at the eighth grade level. Students were not restricted from joining one sport by participation in another sport, other than by seasonal and scheduling constraints. Ridgewood followed the LHSAA guidelines regarding student academic requirements for participation: a student must have a minimum GPA of 1.5 and passing grades in 5 out of 6 subjects.

Championships
Football Championships
(1) State Championship: 1964

Controversies

Barring of a student with disabilities

On July 30, 2020 The Justice Department reached a settlement agreement with Ridgewood. Ridgewood Preparatory School violated the Americans with Disabilities Act by denying a child with spina bifida admission to its pre-kindergarten and kindergarten class because of his disability and it failed to change its policies, practices, and procedures to enable the child to access the school’s programs, it also failed to ensure that its buildings     and facilities are accessible to people with disabilities. The Department of Justice investigated and found that the school, among lots of other things, had inaccessible doors, walkways, and bathrooms. Under the agreement, Ridgewood had to offer the child two years of tuition- free enrollment and, upon enrollment, provide him with reasonable modifications.

Unsafe school tires

A FOX 8 investigation revealed that there are three tires on a school bus that are almost 15 years old. The bus takes students on field trips and the football team to games. The Tire Safety Group says that schools should remove all front bus tires 
after six years but under no scenario should a tire be on a bus longer than 10. The headmaster, M.J. Montgomery, Jr, wouldn't speak to FOX 8 on camera. He invited them into his office but said that their entire discussion was off the record. The only thing that they were allowed to say is that he has no comment on the issue.

Closure
Late on 9 January 2023, the school announced it would be closing in 2 days as of the afternoon of 11 January. Many parents and students were startled by the short notice. <ref><ref>

References

External links
 Ridgewood Prep website
 RPS Alumni website

Private K-12 schools in Louisiana
Schools in Jefferson Parish, Louisiana
Preparatory schools in Louisiana